The Civilian Conservation Corps (CCC) was a voluntary government work relief program that ran from 1933 to 1942 in the United States for unemployed, unmarried men ages 18–25 and eventually expanded to ages 17–28. The CCC was a major part of President Franklin D. Roosevelt's New Deal that supplied manual labor jobs related to the conservation and development of natural resources in rural lands owned by federal, state, and local governments. The CCC was designed to supply jobs for young men and to relieve families who had difficulty finding jobs during the Great Depression in the United States.

Robert Fechner was the first director of this agency, succeeded by James McEntee following Fechner's death. The largest enrollment at any one time was 300,000. Through the course of its nine years in operation, three million young men took part in the CCC, which provided them with shelter, clothing, and food, together with a wage of $30 (equivalent to $1000 in 2021) per month ($25 of which had to be sent home to their families).

The American public made the CCC the most popular of all the New Deal programs. Sources written at the time claimed an individual's enrollment in the CCC led to improved physical condition, heightened morale, and increased employability. The CCC also led to a greater public awareness and appreciation of the outdoors and the nation's natural resources, and the continued need for a carefully planned, comprehensive national program for the protection and development of natural resources.

The CCC operated separate programs for veterans and Native Americans. Approximately 15,000 Native Americans took part in the program, helping them weather the Great Depression.

By 1942, with World War II raging and the draft in effect, the need for work relief declined, and Congress voted to close the program.

Founding
As governor of New York, Franklin D. Roosevelt had run a similar program on a much smaller scale, known as the Temporary Emergency Relief Administration (TERA). It was started in early 1932 to "use men from the lists of the unemployed to improve our existing reforestation areas." In its first year alone, more than 25,000 unemployed New Yorkers would be active in its paid conservation work. Long interested in conservation, as president, Roosevelt proposed to Congress a full-scale national program on March 21, 1933:

He promised this law would provide 250,000 young men with meals, housing, workwear, and medical care for working in the national forests and other government properties. The Emergency Conservation Work (ECW) Act was introduced to Congress the same day and enacted by voice vote on March 31. Roosevelt issued Executive Order 6101 on April 5, 1933, which established the CCC organization and appointed a director, Robert Fechner, a former labor union official who served until 1939. The organization and administration of the CCC was a new experiment in operations for a federal government agency. The order directed that the program be supervised jointly by four government departments: Labor, which recruited the young men; War, which operated the camps; the Agriculture; and Interior, which organized and supervised the work projects. A CCC Advisory Council was composed of a representative from each of the supervising departments. In addition, the Office of Education and Veterans Administration participated in the program. To end the opposition from labor unions (which wanted no training programs started when so many of their men were unemployed) Roosevelt chose Robert Fechner, vice president of the International Association of Machinists and Aerospace Workers, as director of the corps. William Green, head of the American Federation of Labor, was taken to the first camp to demonstrate that there would be no job training involved beyond simple manual labor.

U.S. Army
Reserve officers from the U.S. Army were in charge of the camps, but there was no military training. General Douglas MacArthur was placed in charge of the program, but said that the number of army officers and soldiers assigned to the camps was affecting the readiness of the regular army. However, the army also found numerous benefits in the program. When the draft began in 1940, the policy was to make CCC alumni corporals and sergeants. The CCC also provided command experience to Organized Reserve Corps officers. George Marshall "embraced" the CCC, unlike many of his brother officers.

Through the CCC, the regular army could assess the leadership performance of both regular and reserve officers. The CCC provided lessons which the army used in developing its wartime mobilization plans for training camps.

History
An implicit goal of the CCC was to restore morale in an era of 25% unemployment for all men and much higher rates for poorly educated teenagers. Jeffrey Suzik argues in "'Building Better Men':
The CCC Boy and the Changing Social Ideal of Manliness" that the CCC provided an ideology of manly outdoor work to counter the Depression, as well as cash to help the family budget. Through a regime of heavy manual labor, civic and political education, and an all-male living and working environment, the CCC tried to build "better men" who would be economically independent and self-reliant. By 1939, there was a shift in the ideal from the hardy manual worker to the highly trained citizen soldier ready for war.

Early years, 1933–1937

The legislation and mobilization of the program occurred quite rapidly. Roosevelt made his request to Congress on March 21, 1933; the legislation was submitted to Congress the same day; Congress passed it by voice vote on March 31; Roosevelt signed it the same day, then issued an executive order on April 5 creating the agency, appointing its director (Fechner), and assigning War Department corps area commanders to begin enrollment. The first CCC enrollee was selected April 8, and subsequent lists of unemployed men were supplied by state and local welfare and relief agencies for immediate enrollment. On April 17, the first camp, NF-1, Camp Roosevelt, was established at George Washington National Forest near Luray, Virginia. On June 18, the first of 161 soil erosion control camps was opened, in Clayton, Alabama. By July 1, 1933, there were 1,463 working camps with 250,000 junior enrollees (18–25 years of age); 28,000 veterans; 14,000 American Indians; and 25,000 adults in the Local Experienced Men (LEM) program.

Enrollees

The typical CCC enrollee was a U.S. citizen, unmarried, unemployed male, 18–25 years of age. Normally his family was on local relief. Each enrollee volunteered and, upon passing a physical exam and/or a period of conditioning, was required to serve a minimum six-month period, with the option to serve as many as four periods, or up to two years, if employment outside the Corps was not possible. Enrollees worked 40 hours per week over five days, sometimes including Saturdays if poor weather dictated. In return they received $30 per month with a compulsory allotment of $25 (about ) sent to a family dependent, as well as housing, food, clothing, and medical care.

Veterans Conservation Corps
Following the second Bonus Army march on Washington, D.C., President Roosevelt amended the CCC program on May 11, 1933, to include work opportunities for veterans. Veteran qualifications differed from the junior enrollee; one needed to be certified by the Veterans Administration by an application. They could be any age, and married or single as long as they were in need of work. Veterans were generally assigned to entire veteran camps. Enrollees were eligible for the following "rated" positions to help with camp administration: senior leader, mess steward, storekeeper and two cooks; assistant leader, company clerk, assistant educational advisor and three second cooks. These men received additional pay ranging from $36 to $45 per month depending on their rating.

Camps

Each CCC camp was located in the area of particular conservation work to be performed and organized around a complement of up to 200 civilian enrollees in a designated numbered "company" unit. The CCC camp was a temporary community in itself, structured to have barracks (initially Army tents) for 50 enrollees each, officer/technical staff quarters, medical dispensary, mess hall, recreation hall, educational building, lavatory and showers, technical/administrative offices, tool room/blacksmith shop and motor pool garages.

The company organization of each camp had a dual-authority supervisory staff: firstly, Department of War personnel or Reserve officers (until July 1, 1939), a "company commander" and junior officer, who were responsible for overall camp operation, logistics, education and training; and secondly, ten to fourteen technical service civilians, including a camp "superintendent" and "foreman", employed by either the Departments of Interior or Agriculture, responsible for the particular fieldwork. Also included in camp operation were several non-technical supervisor LEMs, who provided knowledge of the work at hand, "lay of the land," and paternal guidance for inexperienced enrollees. Enrollees were organized into work detail units called "sections" of 25 men each, according to the barracks they resided in. Each section had an enrollee "senior leader" and "assistant leader" who were accountable for the men at work and in the barracks.

Work classifications

The CCC performed 300 types of work projects in nine approved general classifications:
Structural improvements: bridges, fire lookout towers, service buildings
Transportation: truck trails, minor roads, foot trails and airfields
Erosion control: check dams, terracing, and vegetable covering
Flood control: irrigation, drainage, dams, ditching, channel work, riprapping
Forest culture: tree planting, fire prevention, fire pre-suppression, firefighting, insect and disease control
Landscape and recreation: public camp and picnic ground development, lake and pond site clearing and development
Range: stock driveways, elimination of predatory animals
Wildlife: stream improvement, fish stocking, food and cover planting
Miscellaneous: emergency work, surveys, mosquito control

The responses to this seven-month experimental conservation program were enthusiastic. On October 1, 1933, Director Fechner was directed to arrange for the second period of enrollment. By January 1934, 300,000 men were enrolled. In July 1934, this cap was increased by 50,000 to include men from Midwest states that had been affected by drought. The temporary tent camps had also developed to include wooden barracks. An education program had been established, emphasizing job training and literacy.

Approximately 55% of enrollees were from rural communities, a majority of which were non-farm; 45% came from urban areas. Level of education for the enrollee averaged 3% illiterate; 38% had less than eight years of school; 48% did not complete high school; and 11% were high school graduates. At the time of entry, 70% of enrollees were malnourished and poorly clothed. Few had work experience beyond occasional odd jobs. Peace was maintained by the threat of "dishonorable discharge". "This is a training station; we're going to leave morally and physically fit to lick 'Old Man Depression,'" boasted the newsletter, Happy Days, of a North Carolina camp.

Minorities
Because of the power of conservative Solid South white Democrats in Congress, who insisted on racial segregation, most New Deal programs were racially segregated; blacks and whites rarely worked alongside each other. At this time, all the states of the South had passed legislation imposing racial segregation and, since the turn of the century, laws and constitutional provisions that disenfranchised most blacks; they were excluded from formal politics. Because of discrimination by white officials at the local and state levels, blacks in the South did not receive as many benefits as whites from New Deal programs.

In the first few weeks of operation, CCC camps in the North were integrated. By July 1935, however, all camps in the United States were segregated. Enrollment peaked at the end of 1935, when there were 500,000 men in 2,600 camps in operation in every state. All received equal pay and housing. Black leaders lobbied to secure leadership roles. Adult white men held the major leadership roles in all the camps. Director Fechner refused to appoint black adults to any supervisory positions except that of education director in the all-black camps.

Indian Division
The CCC operated a separate division for members of federally recognized tribes: the "Indian Emergency Conservation Work Division" (IECW or CCC-ID). Native men from reservations worked on roads, bridges, clinics, shelters, and other public works near their reservations. Although they were organized as groups classified as camps, no permanent camps were established for Native Americans. Instead, organized groups moved with their families from project to project and were provided with an additional rental allowance. The CCC often provided the only paid work, as many reservations were in remote rural areas. Enrollees had to be between the ages of 17 and 35.

During 1933, about half the male heads of households on the Sioux reservations in South Dakota were employed by the CCC-ID. With grants from the Public Works Administration (PWA), the Indian Division built schools and conducted a road-building program in and around many reservations to improve infrastructure. The mission was to reduce erosion and improve the value of Indian lands. Crews built dams of many types on creeks, then sowed grass on the eroded areas from which the damming material had been taken. They built roads and planted shelter-belts on federal lands. The steady income helped participants regain self-respect, and many used the funds to improve their lives. John Collier, the federal Commissioner of Indian Affairs and Daniel Murphy, the director of the CCC-ID, both based the program on Indian self-rule and the restoration of tribal lands, governments, and cultures. The next year, Congress passed the Indian Reorganization Act of 1934, which ended allotments and helped preserve tribal lands, and encouraged tribes to re-establish self-government.

Collier said of the CCC-Indian Division, "no previous undertaking in Indian Service has so largely been the Indians' own undertaking". Educational programs trained participants in gardening, stock raising, safety, native arts, and some academic subjects. IECW differed from other CCC activities in that it explicitly trained men in skills to be carpenters, truck drivers, radio operators, mechanics, surveyors, and technicians. With the passage of the National Defense Vocational Training Act of 1941, enrollees began participating in defense-oriented training. The government paid for the classes and after students completed courses and passed a competency test, guaranteed automatic employment in defense work. A total of 85,000 Native Americans were enrolled in this training. This proved valuable social capital for the 24,000 alumni who later served in the military and the 40,000 who left the reservations for city jobs supporting the war effort.

Expansion, 1935–1936
Responding to public demand to alleviate unemployment, Congress approved the Emergency Relief Appropriation Act of 1935, on April 8, 1935, which included continued funding for the CCC program through March 31, 1937. The age limit was expanded to 17–28 to include more men. April 1, 1935, to March 31, 1936, was the period of greatest activity and work accomplished by the CCC program. Enrollment peaked at 505,782 in about 2,900 camps by August 31, 1935, followed by a reduction to 350,000 enrollees in 2,019 camps by June 30, 1936. During this period the public response to the CCC program was overwhelmingly popular. A Gallup poll of April 18, 1936, asked: "Are you in favor of the CCC camps?"; 82% of respondents said "yes", including 92% of Democrats and 67% of Republicans.

Change of purpose, 1937–1938
On June 28, 1937, the Civilian Conservation Corps was legally established and transferred from its original designation as the Emergency Conservation Work program. Funding was extended for three more years by Public Law No. 163, 75th Congress, effective July 1, 1937. Congress changed the age limits to 17–23 years old and changed the requirement that enrollees be on relief to "not regularly in attendance at school, or possessing full-time employment." The 1937 law mandated the inclusion of vocational and academic training for a minimum of 10 hours per week. Students in school were allowed to enroll during summer vacation. During this period, the CCC forces contributed to disaster relief following 1937 floods in New York, Vermont, and the Ohio and Mississippi river valleys, and response and clean-up after the 1938 hurricane in New England.

From conservation to defense, 1939–1940
In 1939 Congress ended the independent status of the CCC, transferring it to the control of the Federal Security Agency. The National Youth Administration, U.S. Employment Service, the Office of Education, and the Works Progress Administration also had some responsibilities. About 5,000 reserve officers serving in the camps were affected, as they were transferred to federal Civil Service, and military ranks and titles were eliminated. Despite the loss of overt military leadership in the camps by July 1940, with war underway in Europe and Asia, the government directed an increasing number of CCC projects to resources for national defense. It developed infrastructure for military training facilities and forest protection. By 1940 the CCC was no longer wholly a relief agency, was rapidly losing its non-military character, and it was becoming a system for work-training, as its ranks had become increasingly younger and inexperienced.

Decline and disbandment 1941–1942
Although the CCC was probably the most popular New Deal program, it never was authorized as a permanent agency. The program was reduced in scale as the Depression waned and employment opportunities improved. After conscription began in 1940, fewer eligible young men were available. Following the attack on Pearl Harbor in December 1941, the Roosevelt administration directed all federal programs to emphasize the war effort. Most CCC work, except for wildland firefighting, was shifted onto U.S. military bases to help with construction.

The CCC disbanded one year earlier than planned, as the 77th United States Congress ceased funding it. Operations were formally concluded at the end of the federal fiscal year on June 30, 1942. The end of the CCC program and closing of the camps involved arrangements to leave the incomplete work projects in the best possible state, the separation of about 1,800 appointed employees, the transfer of CCC property to the War and Navy Departments and other agencies, and the preparation of final accountability records. Liquidation of the CCC was ordered by Congress by the Labor-Federal Security Appropriation Act (56 Stat. 569) on July 2, 1942, and virtually completed on June 30, 1943. Liquidation appropriations for the CCC continued through April 20, 1948.

Some former CCC sites in good condition were reactivated from 1941 to 1947 as Civilian Public Service camps where conscientious objectors performed "work of national importance" as an alternative to military service. Other camps were used to hold Japanese, German and Italian Americans interned under the Western Defense Command's Enemy Alien Control Program, as well as Axis prisoners of war. Most of the Japanese American internment camps were built by the people held there. After the CCC disbanded, the federal agencies responsible for public lands organized their own seasonal fire crews, modeled after the CCC. These have performed a firefighting function formerly done by the CCC and provided the same sort of outdoor work experience for young people. Approximately 47 young men have died while in this line of duty.

Museums
 Civilian Conservation Corps Museum at DeSoto State Park, Fort Payne, Alabama
 Civilian Conservation Corps Museum and Memorial, at Monte Sano State Park, Huntsville, Alabama
 Colossal Cave Mountain Park, Vail, Arizona
 Conservation Corps State Museum at Camp San Luis Obispo, San Luis Obispo, California
 North East States Civilian Conservation Corps Museum, Camp Conner, Stafford, Connecticut
 Florida Civilian Conservation Corps Museum at Highlands Hammock State Park, Sebring, Florida
 Civilian Conservation Corps Museum, Vogel State Park, Blairsville, Georgia
 Civilian Conservation Corps Camp in Kokeʻe State Park, Waimea, Kauai County, Hawaii
 Starved Rock State Park (CCC Section in the visitors' center) Oglesby, Illinois
 Iowa Civilian Conservation Corps Museum at Backbone State Park, Strawberry Point, Iowa
 Houghton's Pond, Blue Hills Reservation, Milton, Massachusetts
 Michigan Civilian Conservation Corps Museum, Roscommon, Michigan
 Bear Brook State Park Civilian Conservation Corps (CCC) Camp Historic District, Allenstown, New Hampshire
 New York State Civilian Conservation Corps Museum at Gilbert Lake State Park, New Lisbon, New York
 Masker Museum at Promised Land State Park, Greentown, Pennsylvania
 Lou and Helen Adams Civilian Conservation Corps Museum, Parker Dam State Park, Huston Township, Clearfield County, Pennsylvania
 Civilian Conservation Corps Museum at Lake Greenwood State Recreation Area, Ninety Six, South Carolina
 Civilian Conservation Corps Museum at Pocahontas State Park, Chesterfield, Virginia
 Civilian Conservation Corps Legacy, Edinburg, Virginia
 Civilian Conservation Corps Museum, Rhinelander, Wisconsin
 West Virginia CCC Museum, Harrison County, West Virginia
 Civilian Conservation Corps Museum, Guernsey State Park, Guernsey, Wyoming
 James F. Justin Civilian Conservation Corps Museum
Civilian Conservation Corps History Center at the Minnesota Discovery Center Museum in Chisholm Minnesota

Notable alumni and administrators
David "Stringbean" Akeman, enrollee, country music singer
Norman Borlaug, leader, agronomist, Nobel Peace Prize recipient
Raymond Burr, enrollee, actor 
Borden Deal, enrollee
Hutton Gibson, author
Archie Green, enrollee, folklorist
Henry Gurke, enrollee
Ralph Hauenstein. Army officer in charge of camp
Hubert D. Humphreys, historian
Aldo Leopold, former technical forester, ecologist, environmentalist
Stanley Makowski, enrollee
Walter Matthau, enrollee, actor
Robert Mitchum, enrollee, actor
Archie Moore, enrollee, the Light Heavyweight Boxing Champion of the World
Stan Musial, enrollee, professional baseball player
Edward R. Roybal, enrollee, politician
Red Schoendienst, enrollee, baseball player/manager
Dan White, enrollee, American actor in vaudeville, theater, radio, film and television
Conrad L. Wirth, U.S. administrator, National Park Service supervisor of CCC Program
Chuck Yeager, enrollee, test pilot
Alvin C. York, a project superintendent

Statues

In several cities where CCC workers worked, statues were erected to commemorate them.

In media

Pride of the Bowery (1940), the fourth movie in the East Side Kid series, is a movie about friendship, trouble, and boxing at a CCC camp.
The American Experience PBS series showcased documentaries on American history; it portrayed the life in Civilian Conservation Corps in 2009, in the first episode of Season 22.	
Jeanette Ingold's novel Hitch (2012) is a young adult book about a teenager in the CCC.

Inspired programs
The CCC program was never officially terminated. Congress provided funding for closing the remaining camps in 1942 with the equipment being reallocated. It became a model for conservation programs that were implemented in the period after World War II. Present-day corps are national, state, and local programs that engage primarily youth and young adults (ages 16–25) in community service, training, and educational activities. The nation's approximately 113 corps programs operate in 41 states and the District of Columbia. During 2004, they enrolled more than 23,000 young people. The Corps Network, known originally as the National Association of Service and Conservation Corps (NASCC), works to expand and enhance corps-type programs throughout the country. The Corps Network began in 1985 when the nation's first 24 Corps directors banded together to secure an advocate at the federal level and a repository of information on how best to start and manage a corps. Early financial assistance from the Ford, Hewlett and Mott Foundations was critical to establishing the association.

Similar active programs in the United States are: the National Civilian Community Corps, part of the AmeriCorps program, a team-based national service program in which young adults ages 18–24 spend 10 months working for non-profit and government organizations; and the Civilian Conservation Corps, USA, (CCCUSA) managed by its president, Thomas Hark, in 2016. Hark, his co-founder Mike Rama, currently the Deputy Director of the Corporate Eco Forum (CEF) founded by M. R. Rangaswami, and their team of strategic advisors have reimagined the federal Civilian Conservation Corps program of the 1930s as a private, locally governed, national social franchise. The goal of this recently established CCCUSA is to enroll a million young people annually, building a core set of values in each enrollee, who will then become the catalyst in their own communities and states to create a more civil society and stronger nation.

Student Conservation Association
The CCC program became a model for the creation of team-based national service youth conservation programs such as the Student Conservation Association (SCA). The SCA, founded in 1959, is a nonprofit organization that offers conservation internships and summer trail crew opportunities to more than 4,000 people each year.

California Conservation Corps
In 1976, Governor of California Jerry Brown established the California Conservation Corps. This program had many similar characteristics - residential centers, high expectations for participation, and emphasis on hard work on public lands. Young adults from different backgrounds were recruited for a term of one year. Corps members attended a training session called the Corpsmember Orientation Motivation Education and Training (COMET) program before being assigned to one of the various centers. Project work is also similar to the original CCC of the 1930s - work on public forests, state and federal parks.

Nevada Conservation Corps 
The Nevada Conservation Corps is a non-profit organization that partners with public land management agencies such as the Bureau of Land Management, United States Forest Service, National Park Service, and Nevada State Parks to complete conservation and restoration projects throughout Nevada. Conservation work includes fuel reductions through thinning, constructing and maintaining trails, invasive species removal, and performing biological surveys. The Nevada Conservation Corps was created through the Great Basin Institute and is part of the AmeriCorps program.

Minnesota Conservation Corps
Conservation Corps Minnesota & Iowa provides environmental stewardship and service-learning opportunities to youth and young adults while accomplishing conservation, natural resource management projects and emergency response work through its Young Adult Program and the Summer Youth Program. These programs emphasize the development of job and life skills by conservation and community service work.

Montana Conservation Corps
The Montana Conservation Corps (MCC) is a non-profit organization with a mission to equip young people with the skills and values to be vigorous citizens who improve their communities and environment. Collectively, MCC crews contribute more than 90,000 work hours each year. The MCC was established in 1991 by Montana's Human Resource Development Councils in Billings, Bozeman and Kalispell. Originally, it was a summer program for disadvantaged youth, although it has grown into an AmeriCorps-sponsored non-profit organization with six regional offices that serve Montana, Idaho, Wyoming, North Dakota, and South Dakota. All regions also offer Montana YES (Youth Engaged in Service) summer programs for teenagers who are 14 to 17 years old.

Texas Conservation Corps
Established in 1995, Environmental Corps, now Texas Conservation Corps (TxCC), is an American YouthWorks program which allows youth, ages 17 to 28, to contribute to the restoration and preservation of parks and public lands in Texas. The only conservation corps in Texas, TxcC is a nonprofit corporation based in Austin, Texas, which serves the entire state. Their work ranges from disaster relief to trail building to habitat restoration. TxCC has done projects in national, state, and city parks.

Washington Conservation Corps
The Washington Conservation Corps (WCC) is a sub-agency of the Washington State Department of Ecology. It employs men and women 18 to 25 years old in a program to protect and enhance Washington's natural resources. WCC is a part of the AmeriCorps program.

Vermont Youth Conservation Corps
The Vermont Youth Conservation Corps (VYCC) is a non-profit, youth service and education organization that hires Corps Members, aged 16–24, to work on high-priority conservation projects in Vermont. Through these work projects, Corps Members develop a strong work ethic, strengthen their leadership skills, and learn how to take personal responsibility for their actions. VYCC Crews work at VT State Parks, U.S. Forest Service Campgrounds, in local communities, and throughout the state's backcountry. The VYCC has also given aid to a similar program in North Carolina, which is currently in its infancy.

Youth Conservation Corps
The Youth Conservation Corps is a youth conservation program present in federal lands around the country. The program gives youth aged 13–17 the opportunity to participate in conservation projects in a team setting. YCC programs are available in land managed by the National Park Service, the Forest Service, and the Fish and Wildlife Service. Projects can last up to 10 weeks and typically run over the summer. Some YCC programs are residential, meaning the participants are given housing on the land they work on. Projects may necessitate youth to camp in backcountry settings in order to work on trails or campsites. Most require youth to commute daily or house youth for only a few days a week. Youth are typically paid for their work. YCC programs contribute to the maintenance of public lands and instill a value for hard work and the outdoors in those who participate.

Conservation Legacy
Conservation Legacy is a non-profit employment, job training, and education organization with locations across the United States including Arizona Conservation Corps in Tucson and Flagstaff, Arizona; Conservation Corps New Mexico in  Las Cruces, New Mexico; Southwest Conservation Corps in Durango and Salida, Colorado; and Southeast Conservation Corps in Chattanooga, Tennessee. Conservation Legacy also operates an AmeriCorps VISTA team serving to improve the environment and economies of historic mining communities in the American West and Appalachia. Conservation Legacy also hosts the Environmental Stewards Program - providing internships with federal, state, municipal and NGO land management agencies nationwide. Conservation Legacy formed as a merger of the Southwest Youth Corps, San Luis Valley Youth Corps, The Youth Corps of Southern Arizona, and Coconino Rural Environmental Corps.

Conservation Legacy engages young adults ages 14 to 26 and U.S. military veterans of all ages in personal and professional development experiences involving conservation projects on public lands. Corp members live, work, and learn in teams of six to eight for terms of service ranging from 3 months to 1 year.

Sea Ranger Service 
The Sea Ranger Service is a social enterprise, based in Netherlands, that has taken its inspiration from the Civilian Conservation Corps in running a permanent youth training program, supported by veterans, to manage ocean areas and carry out underwater landscape restoration. Unemployed youths are trained up as Sea Rangers during a bootcamp and subsequently offered full-time employment to manage and regenerate Marine Protected Areas and aid ocean conservation. The Sea Ranger Service works in close cooperation with the Dutch government and national maritime authorities.

Aina Corps 

The Aina Corps performed environmental restoration work in Hawaii in 2020, funded by the CARES Act.

See also
Camp Petenwell
Camp San Luis Obispo
Rabideau CCC Camp
She-She-She Camps
Table Rock Civilian Conservation Corps Camp Site

References

Further reading
 Alexander, Benjamin F. The New Deal’s Forest Army: How the Civilian Conservation Corps Worked. (2018) "+New+Deal’s+Forest+Army" online review 
 American Youth Commission. Youth and the Future: The General Report of the American Youth Commission  (1942)
 Bass, Melissa. The Politics and Civics of National Service: Lessons from the Civilian Conservation Corps, Vista, and AmeriCorps (Brookings Institution Press, 2013)
 Brandimarte, Cynthia, and Angela Reed Brown. Texas State Parks and the CCC: The Legacy of the Civilian Conservation Corps (2013)
 Clancy, Patrick. "Conserving the Youth: the Civilian Conservation Corps Experience in the Shenandoah National Park" The Virginia Magazine of History and Biography Volume: 105. Issue: 4. 1997. p. 439ff. online
 Colen, Olen Jr. The African-American Experience in the Civilian Conservation Corps (1999)
 Heller, Charles E. "The US Army, the Civilian Conservation Corps, and Leadership for World War II, 1933—1942." Armed Forces & Society (2010) 36#3 pp: 439–453.
 Helms, Douglas. "The Civilian Conservation Corps: Demonstrating the Value of Soil Conservation," Journal of Soil and Water Conservation 40 (March–April 1985): 184-188 online
 Hendrickson Jr.; Kenneth E. "Replenishing the Soil and the Soul of Texas: The Civilian Conservation Corps in the Lone Star State as an Example of State-Federal Work Relief during the Great Depression" The Historian, Vol. 65, 2003
 Hill, Edwin G. In the Shadow of the Mountain: The Spirit of the CCC. (1990). 
 Holland, Kenneth, and Frank Ernest Hill. Youth in the CCC (1938) detailed description of all major activities
 Jolley, Harley E. "That Magnificent Army of Youth and Peace": The Civilian Conservation Corps in North Carolina, 1933-1942 (Raleigh: Office of Archives and History, 2007) 167pp.
 Leighninger, Robert D., Jr. Long-Range Public Investment: The Forgotten Legacy of the New Deal (2007), providing a context for American public works programs, and detailing major agencies of the New Deal: CCC, PWA, CWA, WPA, and TVA.
 Maher, Neil M. Nature's New Deal: The Civilian Conservation Corps and the Roots of the American Environmental Movement (2008). excerpt and text search; also online review
 Mielnik, Tara Mitchell. New Deal, New Landscape: The Civilian Conservation Corps and South Carolina's State Parks (University of South Carolina Press; 2011) 201 pages; CCC built 16 state parks in SC between 1933 and 1942.
 Otis, Alison T., William D. Honey, Thomas C. Hogg, and Kimberly K. Lakin The Forest Service and The Civilian Conservation Corps: 1933–42 (United States Forest Service FS-395, August 1986) online
 Paige, John C. The Civilian Conservation Corps and the National Park Service, 1933–1942: An Administrative History. (National Park Service, 1985) online
 Pasquill, Jr., Robert. The Civilian Conservation Corps in Alabama, 1933-1942: A Great and Lasting Good (University of Alabama Press, 2008) 242 pp, with cd of oral interviews
Patel, Kiran Klaus. Soldiers of Labor. Labor Service in Nazi Germany and New Deal America, 1933–1945, (2005), . online review
  (pb 2009) Online free to borrow
 Salmond John A. The Civilian Conservation Corps 1933–1942: a New Deal case study. (1967), the scholarly history of the entire CCC complete text online
 Salmond, John A. "The Civilian Conservation Corps and the Negro," The Journal of American History, Vol. 52, No. 1. (Jun. 1965), pp. 75–88. in JSTOR
 Sherraden, Michael W. "Military Participation in a Youth Employment Program: The Civilian Conservation Corps," Armed Forces and Society, vol. 7, no. 2, pp. 227–245, April 1981, pp. 227–245;  available online from SAGE Publications
 Sommer, Barbara W. Hard Work and a Good Deal: The Civilian Conservation Corps in Minnesota (2008).
 Sommer, Barbara W. "' We Had This Opportunity': African Americans and the Civilian Conservation Corps in Minnesota" in The State We're In: Reflections on Minnesota History, Annette Atkins and Deborah L. Millers, eds. (2010) pp 134–157.
 Steely, James W. "Parks for Texas: Enduring Landscapes of the New Deal" (1999), detailing the interaction of local, state and federal agencies in organizing and guiding CCC work.
 Waller, Robert A. "The Civilian Conservation Corps and the Emergence of South Carolina's State Park System, 1933–1942*South Carolina Historical Magazine Volume: 104#2 2003, p. 101ff.
 Wilson, James; "Community, Civility, and Citizenship: Theatre and Indoctrination in the Civilian Conservation Corps of the 1930s" Theatre History Studies, Vol. 23, 2003, pp. 77–92

Indian Division
Gower, Calvin W. "The CCC Indian Division: Aid for Depressed Americans, 1933–1942," Minnesota History 43 (Spring 1972) 7-12
Parman, Donald L. The Navajos and the New Deal (1969)
Parman, Donald L. "The Indian and the CCC," Pacific Historical Review 40#1 (February 1971): 39-56 online

Primary sources
CCC, "The Civilian Conservation Corps, What It Is and What It Does"  (June 1940)

External links

Civilian Conservation Corps (CCC) Legacy A merged non-profit foundation of the former National Association of CCC Alumni (NACCCA) and the Camp Roosevelt CCC Legacy Foundation
National Archives & Records Administration: Records of the Civilian Conservation Corps (CCC)
The Corps Network (formerly known as NASCC)
Wecantakeit.org, grassroots non-profit to reestablish the USCCC, based in St Petersburg, Florida
Bandelier National Monument Virtual Museum Exhibit and Lesson Plans, from National Park Service
Life in the Civilian Conservation Corps Primary Source Adventure, a lesson plan hosted by CCC in Texas
Top 10 New Deal Programs
James F Justin Civilian Conservation Corps Museum, Online CCC Biographies Stories Photographs, and Documents
LeRoy, Congerville sites of CCC camps - Pantagraph (Bloomington, Illinois newspaper)
Civilian Conservation Corps (CCC): The Arcadia Veteran bulletins from the Rhode Island State Archives
 https://web.archive.org/web/20070807170035/http://www.qmmuseum.lee.army.mil/ccc_forest.htm Army Quartermaster support to the Civilian Conservation Corps during the Great Depression

Civilian Conservation Corps by state
CCC in Idaho Video produced by Idaho Public Television
CCC History Archives in Massachusetts
Rosentreter, Roger L. "Roosevelt's Tree Army: Michigan's Civilian Conservation Corps", with photographs
Encyclopedia of Oklahoma History and Culture, "Civilian Conservation Corps"
A New Deal for Texas Parks - interactive web album of CCC activities in Texas
CCC camps map, a guide to projects in Washington State, with rare photographs. Great Depression in Washington State Project
Webster M. Pidgeon Papers: Civilian Conservation Corps (CCC) photographs and memorabilia from the Rhode Island State Archives
Built To Last: The Legacy of the Civilian Conservation Corps in Minnesota

Individual camps
PelMar Publishing Henderson, James D. Lost in the Woods–The Legacy of CCC Camp Pelican], (2009).

Images
Images of the Civilian Conservation Corps on the Oregon State University Archives Flickr Commons page.
CNY Heritage Digital Library, featuring images of Civilian Conservation Corps members constructing Green Lakes State Park in Central New York (1929–1948).

Documentary, feature and TV movies

 "The Great Depression, Displaced Mountaineers in Shenandoah National Park, and the Civilian Conservation Corps (C.C.C.)", on YouTube
 Youth Jobs Program (CCC) During Great Depression, The March of Time
 President Visits Foresters (CCC), Roosevelt 1933/08/14, newsreel
 Recreation Resources, 1935, West Virginia, available through NARA (National Archives and Records Administration)
 A Nationwide System of Parks 1939, NARA
 Alabama Highlands 1937 Alabama State Parks, NARA
 Down Mobile Way, 1935 Alabama State Parks, NARA
 The Cradle of the Father of Waters, 1938 Minnesota State Parks, Lake Itasca State Park, NARA
 Great Smoky Mountains National Park, 1936, NARA
Land of the Giants, 1935 California, NARA
The East Side Kids (Pride of the Bowery, 1941), Leo Gorcey - Bobby Jordan
 American Experience: The Civilian Conservation Corps, PBS American Experience, 2009
Parks Under the Lone Star, 1933 film detailing Texas CCC projects, Texas Archive of the Moving Image

 
New Deal agencies
Nature conservation organizations based in the United States
1933 establishments in the United States
1942 disestablishments in the United States
73rd United States Congress